Regiment Skoonspruit was a motorised infantry regiment of the South African Army. It formed part of the South African Army Infantry Formation. As a reserve unit, it had a status roughly equivalent to that of a present-day British Army Reserve or United States Army National Guard unit.

History

Origin
This Regiment was formed in 1966.

Operations
The regiment was deployed to the Kaokoveld in 1981 seeing action against SWAPO/PLAN insurgents. A member was killed by an enemy rifle grenade.

Disbandment
The unit was disbanded in 1999.

Insignia

Dress Insignia

Leadership

References

Infantry regiments of South Africa
Military units and formations established in 1966
Military units and formations disestablished in 1999